Tommy Dixon (1882–1941) was an English association footballer who played in the Football League for Middlesbrough. Born in Cramlington, Northumberland, he played as an inside forward or outside right. During his career he also played for Bedlington United, Watford, Bristol Rovers and Blyth Spartans. At Watford, he finished two consecutive seasons as the club's top scorer.

References

1882 births
1941 deaths
People from Cramlington
Footballers from Northumberland
Date of death missing
Place of death missing
English footballers
Middlesbrough F.C. players
Watford F.C. players
Bristol Rovers F.C. players
Blyth Spartans A.F.C. players
Association football forwards
Bedlington United A.F.C. players